Brunswick is the historical English name for the German city of Braunschweig (Low German: Brunswiek, Braunschweig dialect: Bronswiek).

Brunswick may also refer to:

Places and other topographs

Australia
 Brunswick, Victoria, a suburb of Melbourne
 Electoral district of Brunswick, an electoral district in Victoria
 Brunswick Junction, Western Australia, a town near Bunbury
 Brunswick Heads, a town on the North Coast of New South Wales

Canada
 New Brunswick, province in the Maritimes
 Brunswick Parish, New Brunswick, in Queens County
 Brunswick Mountain, North Shore Mountains, British Columbia
 Brunswick House First Nation, Ontario

Chile
 Brunswick Peninsula

Germany
 County of Brunswick, historic Saxon vassal county, elevated to Duchy of Brunswick-Lüneburg in 1235
 Brunswick-Lüneburg, historic German duchy since 1235
 Brunswick-Bevern, a branch principality (1666–1735)
 Brunswick-Calenberg, a branch principality (1485–1692/1708)
 Brunswick-Celle, a branch principality (1269–1705)
 Brunswick-Göttingen, a branch principality (1279–1463)
 Brunswick-Grubenhagen, a branch principality (1291–1596)
 Brunswick-Wolfenbüttel, a branch principality (1269–1815), became the Duchy of Brunswick
 Brunswick Land, a German region surrounding the city of Braunschweig
 Electorate of Brunswick-Lüneburg, a historic state (1692/1708–1814), became the Kingdom of Hanover
 Duchy of Brunswick (1815–1918), became the Free State of Brunswick
 Free State of Brunswick (1918–1946)
 Braunschweig (region), also called "Brunswick" (1978–2004), historic German administrative region

United Kingdom
 Brunswick, Hove, East Sussex, England
 Brunswick railway station, Liverpool
 Brunswick, Manchester, an inner-city area of south Manchester, England, between Ardwick and Chorlton-on-Medlock
 Brunswick, Tyne and Wear, England
 Brunswick Village, England
 Brunswick, West Midlands, England

United States

Counties
 Brunswick County, North Carolina
 Brunswick County, Virginia

Towns and Census-designated places
 Brunswick, Georgia, in Glynn County
 Brunswick, Indiana, in Lake County
 Brunswick, Clay County, Indiana
 Brunswick, Maine, in Cumberland County
 Brunswick (CDP), Maine, census-designated place
 Brunswick Station, Maine, former census-designated place
 Naval Air Station Brunswick
 Brunswick, Maryland, in Frederick County
 Brunswick, Minnesota, in Kanabec County
 Brunswick, Missouri, in Chariton County
 New Brunswick, New Jersey, in Middlesex County
 Brunswick, New York, in Rensselaer County
 Brunswick, North Carolina, in Columbus County
 Brunswick, Ohio, in Medina County
 Brunswick, Wisconsin, in Eau Claire County
 Brunswick, Vermont, in Essex County

Townships
 Brunswick Township, Kanabec County, Minnesota, in Kanabec County
 Brunswick Township, Chariton County, Missouri
 East Brunswick Township, New Jersey, in Middlesex County
 North Brunswick Township, New Jersey, in Middlesex County
 South Brunswick Township, New Jersey, in Middlesex County
 East Brunswick Township, Schuylkill County, Pennsylvania
 West Brunswick Township, Schuylkill County, Pennsylvania
 Brunswick Hills Township, Medina County, Ohio

Villages
 Brunswick, Michigan, in Muskegon County
 Brunswick, Nebraska, in Antelope County
 Brunswick, Tennessee, in Shelby County
 Brunswick, Virginia, in Nottoway County

Other
 Brunswick (Gary), a neighborhood in Gary, Indiana
 Brunswick Town State Historic Site, a historic ghost town in Brunswick County, North Carolina

People
 Brunswick-Bevern, extinct German dynasty
 John Moses Brunswick (1818–1886), founder of Brunswick Corporation
 Léon Brunschvicg (1869–1944), French philosopher
 Otto IV of Brunswick or Otto IV, Holy Roman Emperor (1175 or 1176–1218) ruler of the Holy Roman Empire
 Charles William Ferdinand, Duke of Brunswick-Wolfenbüttel (1735-1806), the "Duke of Brunswick", famous for the Battle of Auerstedt
 Frederick William, Duke of Brunswick-Wolfenbüttel (1771–1815), "The Black Duke", fought with the Duke of Wellington against Napoleon
 Hieronymus Brunschwig (c. 1450–c. 1512) German surgeon, alchemist, and botanist

Roger E. Brunschwig (1891–1972), decorated colonel, activist

Companies
 Brunswick Corporation, an American industrial conglomerate
 Brunswick Records, an American record manufacturer and distributor

Ships
 Brunswick (ship), six merchant and whaling ships
 HMS Brunswick, three ships of the British Royal Navy
 USS Brunswick, four ships of the United States Navy

Other
 Brunswick (clothing), jacket-and-petticoat costume of the 18th century
 Brunswick Black, an old name for Japan black
 Brunswick Green, a dark shade
 Brunswick Manifesto, issued during the French Revolutionary Wars
 Brunswick School, Greenwich, Connecticut, US
 Brunswick stew
 Black Brunswickers,  German volunteer corps in the Napoleonic Wars

See also
 
 Brunsvigia
 Brunswik
 Brunšvik
 Braunschweig (disambiguation)
 Alfred Brunswig (1877–1929), a German philosopher
 Ronnie Brunswijk (1962–), Surinamese rebel leader